Orange Bay is a natural bay located on the eastern side of the Northern Peninsula of the island of Newfoundland, in the Canadian province of Newfoundland and Labrador.

Soufflets River drains into the northern arm of Orange Bay. The abandoned community of Great Harbour Deep was located on the Southern arm. 

Bays of Newfoundland and Labrador